The 2022 WNBA season was the 26th season of the Women's National Basketball Association (WNBA). The Chicago Sky were the defending champions. 

The WNBA's second Commissioner's Cup took place during the regular season, with the Las Vegas Aces winning over the Sky. In the playoffs, the Aces were the first seed and won the Finals over the Connecticut Sun.

The regular season was expanded to 36 games per team, is the most games scheduled in a single WNBA season. A 36-game season was originally scheduled for 2020, but the plan was scrapped due to the COVID-19 pandemic. This season also marked the return of an all-series playoffs, which was last used in 2015, instead of the prior schedule of two rounds of single-elimination games and byes for the higher seeded teams. The first round series used a 2–1 format, with the higher seed hosting the first two games (differing from the 1–1–1 format used up to 2015). The semifinals and finals remained best-of-five series. The playoffs began on August 17 and concluded on September 18.

In May 2022, WNBA Commissioner Cathy Engelbert announced that during this upcoming season, the league would honor the Phoenix Mercury star Brittney Griner with a “BG42” floor decal in a notable spot on the court of all 12 teams. The Mercury center has been detained in Russia since February 2022 after customs officials said they found hashish oil in her luggage at an airport. The "BG42" floor decal was also prominently found on the Mercury's parent team, the Phoenix Suns, during the rest of the year after she was detained in Russia.

2022 WNBA draft

The Washington Mystics won the first pick in the 2022 WNBA draft in the draft lottery. They were followed by the Indiana Fever for second, Atlanta Dream for third, and Los Angeles Sparks for fourth. The Sparks had traded their pick to the Dallas Wings before the lottery, who subsequently sent the pick to the Fever in a trade that helped Dallas secure Teaira McCowan. As part of a three-team trade, Washington and Atlanta swapped lottery picks, resulting in each team receiving 2022's third and first picks respectively. The Fever ended up with four top-10 picks, and seven overall.

Lottery picks

Media coverage
In March 2022, the league announced plans to feature the broadcasts of nine regular season games on ABC, five on ESPN, and ten on ESPN2totaling 25 games, including the 2022 WNBA All-Star Game. The league also revealed that those same channels will air the entire 2022 postseason, which could consist of as many as 27 games.

The remaining national broadcast schedule was released in April and May 2022including two regular season games on CBS and 38 on CBS Sports Network, 46 on NBA TV, 16 on Amazon Prime Video, 20 on Facebook Watch, and 12 on Twitter. Prime Video also streamed the 2022 WNBA Commissioner's Cup Final.

Transactions

The free agency negotiation period started on January 15, while players could sign to a team as soon as February 1.

Coaching changes

Regular season

All-Star Game

Standings

Schedule

|-
| Monday, April 11
| 7:00 p.m.
| colspan=3| 2022 WNBA draft
| colspan=5| USA: ESPNCanada: TSN1/4
| Spring Studios, Tribeca,New York City
|-
| Saturday, April 23
| 9:00 p.m.
| Los Angeles
| @ 
| Seattle
| 
| 68–81
| Stewart (20)
| Nelson-Ododa (12)
| Nelson-Ododa (5)
| Climate Pledge Arena5,734
|-
| Sunday, April 24
| 3:00 p.m.
| Washington
| @ 
| Atlanta
| 
| 69–88
| Wallace (17)
| Austin (12)
| Hines-Allen (7)
| Gateway Center Arena854
|-
| Monday, April 25
| 12:30 p.m.
| Dallas
| @ 
| Chicago
| 
| 92–77
| Tied (24)
| Thompson (10)
| Evans (7)
| Wintrust Arena
|-
| Wednesday, April 27
| 11:30 a.m.
| Minnesota
| @ 
| Washington
| 
| 66–78
| Delle Donne (21)
| Austin (13)
| Cloud (4)
| Entertainment and Sports Arena3,220
|-
| Thursday, April 28
| 10:00 p.m.
| Seattle
| @ 
| Phoenix
| 
| 82–78
| Tied (16)
| Anigwe (8)
| Diggins-Smith (8)
| Footprint Center2,759
|-
| rowspan=3 | Saturday, April 30
| rowspan=2 | 3:00 p.m
| Washington
| @ 
| New York
| 
| 
| colspan=3 align=center| N/A
| Barclays Center
|-
| Chicago
| @ 
| Indiana
| 
| 75–79
| Egbo (15)
| Egbo (10)
| K. Mitchell (5)
| Gainbridge Fieldhouse
|-
| 4:00 p.m.
| Phoenix
| @ 
| Los Angeles
| 
| 84–87
| K. Williams (25)
| Anigwe (11)
| Tied (3)
| MatadomeN/A
|-
| rowspan=2 | Sunday, May 1
| 1:00 p.m.
| Atlanta
| @ 
| Connecticut
| 
| 78–94
| J. Jones (15)
| Tied (6)
| J. Thomas (5)
| Mohegan Sun Arena3,244
|-
| 2:00 p.m.
| Las Vegas
| @ 
| Minnesota
| 
| 86–89
| Plum (16)
| R. Davis (11)
| Plum (5)
| Target CenterN/A
|-
| Monday, May 2
| 2:00 p.m.
| Indiana
| @
| Dallas
| 
| 89–101
| K. Mitchell (21)
| Egbo (9)
| Tied (6)
| College Park CenterN/A

|-
! colspan=2 style="background:#094480; color:white" | 2022 WNBA regular season
|- 

|-
| rowspan=5 | Friday, May 6
|-style="background:#FED8B1"
| 7:00 p.m.
| Indiana
| @ 
| Washington
| Facebook, NBC Sports Washington/Monumental Sports, Fever.WNBA.com
| 70–84
| Delle Donne (21)
| N. Smith (13)
| Cloud (6)
| Entertainment and Sports Arena4,200
|-
| 8:00 p.m.
| Los Angeles
| @ 
| Chicago
| USA: NBA TV, Marquee Sports Network, Spectrum SportsnetCanada: NBA TV Canada
| 98–91 (OT)
| Evans (24)
| Meesseman (8)
| Tied (8)
| Wintrust Arena8,111
|-style="background:#FED8B1"
| rowspan=2 | 10:00 p.m.
| Las Vegas
| @ 
| Phoenix
| USA: NBA TV, Bally Sports Arizona ExtraCanada: TSN5
| 106–88
| Diggins-Smith (25)
| Wilson (11)
| Taurasi (9)
| Footprint Center7,167
|-style="background:#FED8B1"
| Minnesota
| @ 
| Seattle
| Twitter, FOX 13+/Amazon Prime (Seattle), The CW (Twin Cities)
| 74–97
| Tied (17)
| Shepard (12)
| Bird (9)
| Climate Pledge Arena12,904
|-
| rowspan=3 | Saturday, May 7
|-style="background:#FED8B1"
| 6:00 p.m.
| Connecticut
| @ 
| New York
| USA: ESPNCanada: TSN1/3/5
| 79–81
| Tied (25)
| Tied (7)
| Tied (6)
| Barclays Center6,829
|-
| 8:00 p.m.
| Atlanta
| @ 
| Dallas
| CBSSN
| 66–59
| Mabrey (20)
| Billings (14)
| R. Howard (4)
| College Park Center5,796
|-
| rowspan=3 | Sunday, May 8
| 3:00 p.m.
| Los Angeles
| @ 
| Indiana
| Amazon Prime
| 87–77
| Cambage (22)
| Cambage (11)
| K. Mitchell (7)
| Gainbridge Fieldhouse2,545
|-
| 8:00 p.m.
| Washington
| @ 
| Minnesota
| USA: ESPN2Canada: NBA TV Canada
| 78–66
| Atkins (20)
| Shepard (12)
| Cloud (6)
| Target Center8,134
|- style="background:#FED8B1"
| 10:00 p.m.
| Seattle
| @ 
| Las Vegas
| USA: ESPN2Canada: NBA TV Canada
| 74–85
| Stewart (21)
| Hamby (19)
| Tied (7)
| Michelob Ultra Arena6,212
|-
| rowspan=2 | Tuesday, May 10
| rowspan=2 | 7:00 p.m.
| Las Vegas
| @ 
| Washington
| Facebook
| 76–89
| Tied (19)
| Wilson (11)
| Hines-Allen (8)
| Entertainment and Sports Arena3,082
|-
| Minnesota
| @ 
| Indiana
| 
| 76–82
| Tied (26)
| Fowles (14)
| Shepard (9)
| Gainbridge Fieldhouse1,078
|-
| rowspan=3 | Wednesday, May 11
| 7:00 p.m.
| Los Angeles
| @ 
| Atlanta
| USA: Bally Sports South, Spectrum SportsnetCanada: TSN5
| 75–77
| R. Howard (21)
| N. Ogwumike (15)
| Wheeler (5)
| Gateway Center Arena3,138
|- style="background:#FED8B1" 
| 8:00 p.m.
| New York
| @ 
| Chicago
| CBSSN
| 50–83
| Evans (15)
| 4 tied (6)
| Tied (6)
| Wintrust Arena4,935
|- style="background:#FED8B1"
| 10:00 p.m.
| Seattle
| @ 
| Phoenix
| Amazon Prime
| 77–97
| Loyd (26)
| Charles (11)
| 3 tied (6)
| Footprint Center6,098
|-
| rowspan=3 | Friday, May 13
| 7:00 p.m.
| Dallas
| @ 
| Washington
| 
| 94–86
| Ogunbowale (27)
| Harrison (10)
| Harris (10)
| Entertainment and Sports Arena3,281
|-
| 7:30 p.m.
| Las Vegas
| @ 
| Atlanta
| 
| 96–73
| McDonald (20)
| Hamby (13)
| Plum (11)
| Gateway Center Arena3,138
|- style="background:#FED8B1"
| 8:00 p.m.
| Indiana
| @ 
| New York
| USA: TwitterCanada: NBA TV Canada
| 92–86 (OT)
| Ionescu (31)
| N. Smith (17)
| Ionescu (7)
| Barclays Center3,289
|-
| rowspan=4 | Saturday, May 14
|- style="background:#FED8B1"
| 3:00 p.m.
| Phoenix
| @ 
| Seattle
| USA: ABCCanada: TSN2
| 69–64
| Loyd (26)
| Tied (14)
| Diggins-Smith (5)
| Climate Pledge Arena12,453
|-
| 7:00 p.m.
| Los Angeles
| @ 
| Connecticut
| Facebook
| 60–77
| A. Thomas (23)
| Jo. Jones (12)
| A. Thomas (5)
| Mohegan Sun Arena5,624
|-
| 8:00 p.m.
| Chicago
| @ 
| Minnesota
| USA: NBA TVCanada: NBA TV Canada
| 82–78
| Milić (18)
| Fowles (11)
| Vandersloot (11)
| Target Center6,503
|-
| rowspan=2 | Sunday, May 15
| 2:00 p.m.
| Dallas
| @ 
| New York
| 
| 81–71
| Ogunbowale (21)
| Thornton (10)
| Ionescu (6)
| Barclays Center3,095
|- style="background:#FED8B1"
| 3:00 p.m.
| Atlanta
| @ 
| Indiana
| Amazon Prime
| 85–79
| R. Howard (33)
| Egbo (9)
| Tied (4)
| Gainbridge Fieldhouse1,745
|-
| rowspan=5 | Tuesday, May 17
| rowspan=2 | 7:00 p.m.
| Connecticut
| @ 
| New York
| 
| 92–65
| Tied (16)
| Dolson (7)
| Ionescu (4)
| Barclays Center3,054
|-
| Atlanta
| @ 
| Indiana
| USA: League PassCanada: TSN5
| 101–79
| R. Howard (19)
| Engstler (10)
| 3 tied (5)
| Gainbridge Fieldhouse960
|-
| 8:00 p.m.
| Washington
| @ 
| Dallas
| CBSSN
| 84–68
| Austin (20)
| Tied (8)
| Cloud (7)
| College Park Center3,035
|- style="background:#FED8B1"
| 10:00 p.m.
| Phoenix
| @ 
| Las Vegas
| CBSSN
| 74–86
| Plum (20)
| Wilson (10)
| C. Gray (9)
| Michelob Ultra Arena2,536
|- style="background:#FED8B1"
| 10:30 p.m.
| Minnesota
| @ 
| Los Angeles
| USA: League PassCanada: NBA TV Canada
| 87–84
| McBride (24)
| Fowles (12)
| Tied (6)
| Crypto.com Arena4,701
|-
| Wednesday, May 18
| 10:00 p.m.
| Chicago
| @ 
| Seattle
| Facebook
| 71–74
| Magbegor (21)
| Ca. Parker (9)
| Vandersloot (12)
| Climate Pledge Arena7,450
|-
| rowspan=3 | Thursday, May 19
|- style="background:#FED8B1"
| rowspan=2 | 10:00 p.m.
| Minnesota
| @ 
| Las Vegas
| 
| 87–93
| Tied (25)
| Shepard (14)
| Tied (7)
| Michelob Ultra Arena3,640
|- style="background:#FED8B1"
| Dallas
| @ 
| Phoenix
| 
| 94–84
| Ogunbowale (37)
| Tied (11)
| Mabrey (10)
| Footprint Center6,151
|-
| rowspan=4 | Friday, May 20
|- style="background:#FED8B1"
| 7:00 p.m.
| Indiana
| @ 
| Connecticut
| 
| 85–94
| Mitchell (23)
| Jo. Jones (8)
| Robinson (6)
| Mohegan Sun Arena4,428
|- style="background:#FED8B1"
| 7:30 p.m.
| Washington
| @ 
| Atlanta
| Twitter
| 78–73
| R. Howard (21)
| Coffey (10)
| Tied (5)
| Gateway Center ArenaN/A
|- style="background:#FED8B1"
| 10:00 p.m.
| Los Angeles
| @ 
| Seattle
| 
| 80–83
| Stewart (28)
| Magbegor (11)
| Bird (8)
| Climate Pledge Arena10,103
|-
| rowspan=2 | Saturday, May 21
| 3:00 p.m.
| Phoenix
| @ 
| Las Vegas
| USA: ABCCanada: TSN2
| 80–100
| Plum (24)
| Plaisance (9)
| Taurasi (7)
| Michelob Ultra Arena5,572
|- style="background:#FED8B1"
| 8:00 p.m.
| Minnesota
| @ 
| Dallas
| 
| 78–94
| Mabrey (22)
| Fowles (9)
| Ogunbowale (7)
| College Park Center3,813
|-
| rowspan=3 | Sunday, May 22
|- style="background:#FED8B1"
| 2:00 p.m.
| Connecticut
| @ 
| Indiana
| ESPN3
| 92–70
| Tied (18)
| Jo. Jones (9)
| A. Thomas (6)
| Gainbridge Fieldhouse2,612
|- style="background:#FED8B1"
| 3:00 p.m.
| Chicago
| @ 
| Washington
| USA: ABCCanada: NBA TV Canada
| 82–73
| Atkins (20)
| Ca. Parker (13)
| Tied (10)
| Entertainment and Sports Arena4,200
|-
| rowspan=2 | Monday, May 23
|- style="background:#FED8B1"
| 10:00 p.m.
| Los Angeles
| @ 
| Las Vegas
| Facebook
| 76–104
| Wilson (24)
| Young (9)
| Canada (9)
| Michelob Ultra Arena4,092
|-
| rowspan=4 | Tuesday, May 24
| 7:00 p.m.
| Dallas
| @ 
| Connecticut
| USA: League PassCanada: TSN5
| 85–77
| Mabrey (20)
| Jo. Jones (12)
| A. Thomas (9)
| Mohegan Sun Arena4,180
|- style="background:#FED8B1"
| 7:00 p.m.
| Atlanta
| @ 
| Washington
| 
| 50–70
| Delle Donne (15)
| 3 tied (7)
| Cloud (7)
| Entertainment and Sports Arena2,687
|- style="background:#FED8B1"
| 8:00 p.m.
| Indiana
| @ 
| Chicago
| 
| 90–95
| K. Mitchell (25)
| Engstler (13)
| Tied (7)
| Wintrust Arena7,741
|-
| 8:00 p.m.
| New York
| @ 
| Minnesota
| 
| 78–84
| N. Howard (23)
| Fowles (14)
| Whitcomb (9)
| Target Center6,104
|-
| rowspan=2 | Wednesday, May 25
|- style="background:#FED8B1"
| 10:30 p.m.
| Phoenix
| @ 
| Los Angeles
| Amazon Prime
| 94–99
| Diggins-Smith (28)
| Tied (7)
| DeShields (9)
| Crypto.com Arena4,020
|-
| Thursday, May 26
| 7:00 p.m.
| Dallas
| @ 
| Connecticut
| 
| 68–99
| Tied (18)
| Tied (7)
| Hideman (6)
| Mohegan Sun Arena4,308
|-
| rowspan=2 | Friday, May 27
| 7:00 p.m.
| Los Angeles
| @ 
| Indiana
| Twitter
| 96–101
| N. Ogwumike (30)
| N. Ogwumike (10)
| Robinson (11)
| Indiana Farmers Coliseum1,417
|-
| 10:00 p.m.
| New York
| @ 
| Seattle
| USA: League PassCanada: NBA TV Canada
| 71–79
| Stewart (31)
| 4 tied (9)
| Whitcomb (8)
| Climate Pledge Arena10,001
|-
| rowspan=2 | Saturday, May 28
| 3:00 p.m.
| Las Vegas
| @ 
| Chicago
| USA: ABCCanada: SN360
| 83–76
| Wilson (22)
| Wilson (16)
| 3 tied (6)
| Wintrust Arena6,812
|- style="background:#FED8B1"
| 7:00 p.m.
| Washington
| @ 
| Connecticut
| USA: NBA TVCanada: NBA TV Canada
| 71–79
| 3 tied (14)
| A. Thomas (10)
| C. Williams (7)
| Mohegan Sun Arena5,482
|-
| rowspan=3 | Sunday, May 29
| 12:00 p.m.
| Phoenix
| @ 
| Atlanta
| CBS
| 54–81
| DeShields (23)
| Ch. Parker (10)
| R. Howard (6)
| Gateway Center Arena3,138
|-
| 6:00 p.m.
| New York
| @ 
| Seattle
| USA: League PassCanada: NBA TV Canada
| 61–92 
| Loyd (22)
| Lavender (10)
| Loyd (6)
| Climate Pledge Arena10,228
|- style="background:#FED8B1"
| 7:00 p.m.
| Los Angeles
| @ 
| Minnesota
| Amazon Prime
| 85–83
| Carter (20)
| Fowles (7)
| 3 tied (4)
| Target Center7,234
|-
| rowspan=5 | Tuesday, May 31
|- style="background:#FED8B1"
| 7:00 p.m.
| Washington
| @ 
| Indiana
| ESPN3
| 87–75
| Atkins (28)
| E. Williams (15)
| Cloud (9)
| Indiana Farmers Coliseum1,009
|-
| 7:00 p.m.
| Phoenix
| @ 
| Chicago
| USA: ESPN2Canada: TSN4/5
| 70–73
| Charles (25)
| Ca. Parker (11)
| Diggins-Smith (8)
| Wintrust Arena5,133
|-
| 9:00 p.m.
| Connecticut
| @ 
| Las Vegas
| USA: ESPNCanada: TSN4/5
| 81–89
| Wilson (24)
| Wilson (14)
| Plum (7)
| Michelob Ultra Arena4,693
|- style="background:#FED8B1"
| 10:30 p.m.
| Dallas
| @ 
| Los Angeles
| ESPN3
| 91–93
| Sykes (25)
| N. Ogwumike (10)
| Tied (6)
| Crypto.com Arena4,852

|-
| rowspan=2 | Wednesday, June 1
| rowspan=2 | 7:00 p.m.
| Minnesota
| @ 
| Atlanta
| USA: League PassCanada: SN360
| 76–84
| R. Howard (22)
| Fowles (20)
| Wheeler (9)
| Gateway Center Arena1,268
|-
| Indiana
| @ 
| New York
| CBSSN
| 74–87
| Ionescu (23)
| Dolson (8)
| Dolson (7)
| Barclays Center4,079
|-
| Thursday, June 2
| 10:00 p.m.
| Connecticut
| @ 
| Las Vegas
| Facebook
| 97–90
| Young (26)
| A. Thomas (12)
| Plum (8)
| Michelob Ultra Arena3,801
|-
| rowspan=5 | Friday, June 3
|- style="background:#FED8B1"
| 7:00 p.m.
| New York
| @ 
| Washington
| Twitter
| 74–70
| Ionescu (24)
| Tied (8)
| Cloud (8)
| Entertainment and Sports Arena3,857
|- style="background:#FED8B1"
| 7:30 p.m.
| Chicago
| @ 
| Atlanta
| 
| 73–65
| Copper (21)
| Copper (8)
| Vandersloot (6)
| Gateway Center Arena3,138
|-
| 10:00 p.m.
| Connecticut
| @ 
| Phoenix
| CBSSN
| 92–88
| Taurasi (32)
| A. Thomas (10)
| A. Thomas (7)
| Footprint Center7,180
|- style="background:#FED8B1"
| 10:00 p.m.
| Dallas
| @ 
| Seattle
| 
| 68–51
| Stewart (27)
| Sabally (11)
| January (7)
| Climate Pledge Arena8,023
|-
| rowspan=6 | Sunday, June 5
| 2:00 p.m.
| Minnesota
| @ 
| New York
| 
| 84–77
| Ionescu (31)
| Fowles (8)
| Ionescu (7)
| Barclays Center4,119
|- style="background:#FED8B1"
| 3:00 p.m.
| Indiana
| @ 
| Atlanta
| 
| 66–75
| K. Mitchell (20)
| Coffey (10)
| Henderson (5)
| Gateway Center Arena3,000
|- style="background:#FED8B1"
| 6:00 p.m.
| Washington
| @ 
| Chicago
| Amazon Prime
| 82–91
| Hawkins (21)
| Ca. Parker (13)
| Machida (9)
| Wintrust Arena6,228
|- style="background:#FED8B1"
| 6:00 p.m.
| Dallas
| @ 
| Las Vegas
| 
| 78–84
| Plum (32)
| Thornton (15)
| 3 tied (5)
| Michelob Ultra Arena4,814
|- style="background:#FED8B1"
| 6:00 p.m.
| Los Angeles
| @ 
| Phoenix
| USA: League PassCanada: SN360
| 74–81
| Diggins-Smith (29)
| B. Turner (9)
| Taurasi (7)
| Footprint Center10,151
|-
| 6:00 p.m.
| Connecticut
| @ 
| Seattle
| 
| 93–86
| J. Jones (25)
| A. Thomas (8)
| A. Thomas (12)
| Climate Pledge Arena11,330
|-
| rowspan=2 | Tuesday, June 7
| 8:00 p.m.
| Minnesota
| @ 
| New York
| CBSSN
| 69–88
| Ionescu (26)
| Ionescu (8)
| Ionescu (8)
| Barclays Center3,196
|-
| 10:00 p.m.
| Atlanta
| @ 
| Seattle
| CBSSN
| 60–72
| Loyd (26)
| Ch. Parker (10)
| Bird (6)
| Climate Pledge Arena7,262
|-
| rowspan=2 | Wednesday, June 8
| 7:00 p.m.
| Indiana
| @ 
| Connecticut
| USA: League PassCanada: NBA TV Canada
| 69–88
| N. Smith (19)
| 3 tied (9)
| Tied (5)
| Mohegan Sun Arena4,088
|-
| 8:00 p.m.
| Chicago
| @ 
| Washington
| CBSSN
| 82–84
| Atkins (19)
| Ca. Parker (9)
| 3 tied (5)
| Entertainment and Sports Arena2,984
|-
| rowspan=6 | Friday, June 10
|- style="background:#FED8B1"
| rowspan=2 | 7:00 p.m.
| Chicago
| @ 
| Connecticut
| Twitter
| 83–79
| Meesseman (26)
| J. Jones (14)
| Tied (8)
| Mohegan Sun Arena4,816
|- style="background:#FED8B1"
| New York
| @ 
| Indiana
| 
| 97–83
| N. Howard (25)
| N. Howard (10)
| Ionescu (7)
| Indiana Farmers Coliseum1,393
|- style="background:#FED8B1"
| 8:00 p.m.
| Seattle
| @ 
| Dallas
| CBSSN
| 89–88
| Stewart (32)
| Stewart (11)
| G. Williams (9)
| College Park Center3,292
|-
| 8:00 p.m.
| Washington
| @ 
| Minnesota
| USA: League PassCanada: NBA TV Canada
| 76–59
| Hines-Allen (17)
| Shepard (15)
| Cloud (8)
| Target Center6,315
|-
| 10:00 p.m.
| Atlanta
| @ 
| Phoenix
| CBSSN
| 88–90
| R. Howard (25)
| Tied (13)
| Taurasi (6)
| Footprint Center7,650
|-
| rowspan=2 | Saturday, June 11
|- style="background:#FED8B1"
| 9:00 p.m.
| Las Vegas
| @ 
| Los Angeles
| Facebook
| 89–72
| Wilson (35)
| Wilson (11)
| Tied (8)
| Crypto.com Arena8,200
|-
| rowspan=5 | Sunday, June 12
|- style="background:#FED8B1"
| 2:00 p.m.
| Chicago
| @
| New York
| Amazon Prime
| 88–86
| Ionescu (27)
| Ionescu (13)
| Ionescu (12)
| Barclays Center4,810
|-
| 4:00 p.m.
| Seattle
| @ 
| Dallas
| 
| 84–79
| Stewart (25)
| Thornton (14)
| Bird (7)
| College Park Center3,273
|-
| 6:00 p.m.
| Phoenix
| @ 
| Washington
| 
| 99–90 (OT)
| Diggins-Smith (27)
| Tied (10)
| Tied (7)
| Entertainment and Sports Arena4,200
|-
| 7:00 p.m.
| Indiana
| @ 
| Minnesota
| USA: League PassCanada: SN360, NBA TV Canada
| 84–80
| Milić (23)
| N. Smith (14)
| Powers (7)
| Target Center6,806
|-
| rowspan=2 | Tuesday, June 14
| 7:00 p.m.
| Phoenix
| @ 
| Washington
| USA: ESPNCanada: TSN1
| 65–83
| DeShields (21)
| Austin (10)
| Cloud (10)
| Entertainment and Sports Arena3,088
|- style="background:#FED8B1"
| 9:00 p.m.
| Seattle
| @ 
| Minnesota
| USA: ESPNCanada: NBA TV Canada
| 81–79
| Stewart (29)
| G. Williams (10)
| G. Williams (8)
| Target Center6,031
|-
| rowspan=4 | Wednesday, June 15
|- style="background:#FED8B1"
| 1:00 p.m.
| Las Vegas
| @ 
| Dallas
| 
| 92–84
| Ogunbowale (28)
| Hamby (12)
| C. Gray (8)
| College Park Center4,375
|- style="background:#FED8B1"
| 7:00 p.m.
| Atlanta
| @ 
| Connecticut
| 
| 92–105
| Durr (21)
| Tied (9)
| A. Thomas (6)
| Mohegan Sun Arena4,014
|-
| 7:00 p.m.
| Phoenix
| @ 
| Indiana
| USA: League PassCanada: TSN3/5
| 93–80
| Charles (29)
| N. Smith (14)
| Peddy (7)
| Indiana Farmers Coliseum1,824
|-
| rowspan=2 | Thursday, June 16
|- style="background:#FED8B1"
| 7:00 p.m.
| Washington
| @ 
| New York
| 
| 65–77
| N. Howard (27)
| N. Howard (7)
| Ionescu (9)
| Entertainment and Sports Arena4,168
|-
| rowspan=3 | Friday, June 17
| 7:00 p.m.
| Seattle
| @ 
| Connecticut
| CBSSN
| 71–82
| Bonner (20)
| J. Jones (13)
| A. Thomas (8)
| Mohegan Sun Arena7,088
|- style="background:#FED8B1"
| rowspan=2 | 8:00 p.m.
| Phoenix
| @ 
| Dallas
| Twitter
| 88–93
| Charles (27)
| McCowan (10)
| Diggins-Smith (10)
| College Park Center3,140
|- style="background:#FED8B1"
| Atlanta
| @ 
| Chicago
| Facebook
| 100–106 (OT)
| Copper (23)
| Meesseman (12)
| R. Howard (7)
| Wintrust Arena7,435
|-
| rowspan=5 | Sunday, June 19
| 12:00 p.m.
| Seattle
| @ 
| New York
| USA: ESPNCanada: SN360
| 81–72
| Tied (23)
| N. Howard (11)
| Ionescu (10)
| Barclays Center6,859
|- style="background:#FED8B1"
| 2:00 p.m.
| Connecticut
| @ 
| Washington
| CBS
| 63–71
| Tied (15)
| J. Jones (16)
| Atkins (6)
| Entertainment and Sports Arena3,959
|- style="background:#FED8B1"
| 3:00 p.m.
| Chicago
| @ 
| Indiana
| 
| 87–89
| Copper (28)
| N. Smith (11)
| K. Mitchell (9)
| Indiana Farmers Coliseum1,706
|- style="background:#FED8B1"
| 4:00 p.m.
| Los Angeles
| @ 
| Dallas
| Amazon Prime
| 82–92
| Ogunbowale (27)
| A. Gray (12)
| A. Gray (6)
| College Park Center3,779
|-
| 6:00 p.m.
| Minnesota
| @ 
| Las Vegas
| CBSSN
| 95–96
| Wilson (25)
| Shepard (19)
| C. Gray (8)
| Michelob Ultra Arena4,603
|-
| rowspan=4 | Tuesday, June 21
| 7:00 p.m.
| Dallas
| @ 
| Atlanta
| NBA TV
| 75–80
| Tied (18)
| R. Howard (8)
| McDonald (5)
| Gateway Center Arena
|-
| 10:00 p.m.
| Chicago
| @ 
| Las Vegas
| CBSSN
| 104–95
| Vandersloot (25)
| Wilson (11)
| Vandersloot (8)
| Michelob Ultra Arena4,951
|- style="background:#FED8B1"
| 10:00 p.m.
| Minnesota
| @ 
| Phoenix
| NBA TV
| 84–71
| Diggins-Smith (25)
| Shepard (13)
| Jefferson (9)
| Footprint Center6,394
|-
| 10:30 p.m.
| Washington
| @ 
| Los Angeles
| 
| 82–84
| Atkins (22)
| C. Ogwumike (9)
| Cloud (13)
| Crypto.com Arena3,745
|-
| rowspan=2 | Wednesday, June 22
|- style="background:#FED8B1"
| 7:00 p.m.
| New York
| @ 
| Connecticut
| USA: ESPN2Canada: TSN3
| 81–77
| Tied (16)
| Tied (11)
| Ionescu (6)
| Mohegan Sun Arena4,652
|-
| rowspan=4 | Thursday, June 23
| 8:00 p.m.
| Indiana
| @ 
| Dallas
| CBSSN
| 68–94
| Ogunbowale (24)
| Egbo (12)
| Ogunbowale (6)
| College Park Center2,791
|- style="background:#FED8B1"
| 8:00 p.m.
| Phoenix
| @ 
| Minnesota
| Facebook
| 88–100
| Charles (26)
| Fowles (10)
| Powers (6)
| Target Center8,004
|-
| 10:00 p.m.
| Washington
| @ 
| Seattle
| CBSSN
| 71–85
| Loyd (22)
| Tied (9)
| Tied (8)
| Climate Pledge Arena9,884
|-
| 10:30 p.m.
| Chicago
| @ 
| Los Angeles
| Facebook
| 82–59
| 3 tied (15)
| Ca. Parker (14)
| Ca. Parker (10)
| Crypto.com Arena5,627
|-
| rowspan=2 | Friday, June 24
|- style="background:#FED8B1"
| 7:30 p.m.
| New York
| @ 
| Atlanta
| CBSSN
| 89–77
| Durr (23)
| N. Howard (10)
| Ionescu (8)
| Gateway Center Arena2,697
|-
| rowspan=3 | Saturday, June 25
| 8:00 p.m.
| Phoenix
| @ 
| Dallas
| USA: NBA TVCanada: NBA TV Canada
| 83–72
| Diggins-Smith (26)
| Tied (10)
| Tied (6)
| College Park Center4,240
|-
| 9:00 p.m.
| Los Angeles
| @ 
| Seattle
| Facebook
| 85–77
| Stewart (28)
| Tied (8)
| Sykes (8)
| Climate Pledge Arena9,955
|-
| 10:00 p.m.
| Washington
| @ 
| Las Vegas
| USA: NBA TVCanada: NBA TV Canada
| 87–86 (OT)
| 3 tied (20)
| Wilson (14)
| Cloud (10)
| Michelob Ultra Arena7,171
|-
| rowspan=3 | Sunday, June 26
|- style="background:#FED8B1"
| 3:00 p.m.
| Connecticut
| @ 
| Atlanta
| Amazon Prime
| 72–61
| Tied (17)
| A. Thomas (11)
| A. Thomas (8)
| Gateway Center Arena2,722
|-
| 6:00 p.m.
| Minnesota
| @ 
| Chicago
| CBSSN
| 85–88
| Vandersloot (18)
| Tied (8)
| Tied (7)
| Wintrust Arena7,022
|-
| rowspan=2 | Monday, June 27
| 10:00 p.m.
| Indiana
| @ 
| Phoenix
| Amazon Prime
| 71–83
| Taurasi (27)
| N. Smith (10)
| Peddy (5)
| Footprint Center5,044
|-
| 10:30 p.m.
| Las Vegas
| @ 
| Los Angeles
| USA: NBA TVCanada: NBA TV Canada
| 79–73
| Plum (29)
| 3 tied (11)
| Tied (7)
| Crypto.com Arena4,200
|-
| rowspan=2 | Tuesday, June 28
| 7:00 p.m.
| Atlanta
| @ 
| Washington
| ESPN2
| 74–92
| Cloud (18)
| Tied (7)
| Machia (5)
| Entertainment and Sports Arena3,517
|- style="background:#FED8B1"
| 8:00 p.m.
| Dallas
| @ 
| Minnesota
| USA: ESPN3Canada: NBA TV Canada
| 64–92
| Powers (20)
| Achonwa (13)
| Jefferson (10)
| Target Center5,603
|-
| rowspan=4 | Wednesday, June 29
|- style="background:#FED8B1"
| 12:00 p.m.
| Connecticut
| @ 
| Chicago
| USA: NBA TVCanada: NBA TV Canada
| 83–91
| Ca. Parker (25)
| Tied (11)
| Tied (7)
| Wintrust Arena6,709
|-
| 10:00 p.m.
| Indiana
| @ 
| Phoenix
| USA: NBA TVCanada: NBA TV Canada
| 78–99
| K. Mitchell (21)
| B. Turner (11)
| Tied (7)
| Footprint Center5,833
|- style="background:#FED8B1"
| 10:00 p.m.
| Las Vegas
| @ 
| Seattle
| Amazon Prime
| 78–88
| Loyd (24)
| Wilson (16)
| Gray (8)
| Climate Pledge Arena9,499
|-
| rowspan=2 | Thursday, June 30
|- style="background:#FED8B1"
| 7:00 p.m.
| Atlanta
| @ 
| New York
| Twitter
| 92–81 (OT)
| Hayes (21)
| Ionescu (13)
| Wheeler (8)
| Barclays Center6,161

|-
| rowspan=3 | Friday, July 1
| 8:00 p.m.
| Los Angeles
| @ 
| Dallas
| CBSSN
| 97–89
| Ogunbowale (23)
| Cambage (11)
| Toliver (7)
| College Park Center3,187
|- style="background:#FED8B1"
| 8:00 p.m.
| Las Vegas
| @ 
| Minnesota
| USA: NBA TVCanada: NBA TV Canada
| 91–85
| Banham (24)
| Wilson (12)
| Plum (10)
| Target Center6,104
|-
| 10:00 p.m.
| Indiana
| @ 
| Seattle
| Facebook
| 57–73
| Stewart (20)
| Egbo (12)
| Loyd
| Climate Pledge Arena8,565
|-
| Saturday, July 2
| 1:00 p.m.
| Phoenix
| @ 
| Chicago
| USA: ESPNCanada: SN1
| 75–91
| Diggins-Smith (25)
| DeShields (9)
| Ca. Parker (7)
| Wintrust Arena8,028
|-
| rowspan=4 | Sunday, July 3
| 1:00 p.m.
| Washington
| @ 
| Connecticut
| USA: ESPNCanada: SN1
| 72–74 (OT)
| A. Thomas (23)
| Hines-Allen (13)
| Cloud (6)
| Mohegan Sun Arena5,814
|-
| 3:00 p.m.
| Seattle
| @ 
| Atlanta
| NBA TV
| 76–90
| Ch. Parker (21)
| Billings (10)
| Wallace (6)
| Gateway Center Arena3,138
|-
| 6:00 p.m.
| New York
| @ 
| Los Angeles
| CBSSN
| 74–84
| N. Ogwumike (22)
| C. Ogwumike (10)
| Ionescu (8)
| Crypto.com Arena5,436
|-
| 7:00 p.m.
| Las Vegas
| @ 
| Minnesota
| Amazon Prime
| 71–102
| Powers (32)
| Fowles (11)
| Jefferson (6)
| Target Center7,603
|-
| Monday, July 4
| 7:00 p.m.
| Phoenix
| @ 
| Los Angeles
| USA: ESPNCanada: NBA TV Canada
| 75–78
| N. Ogwumike (23)
| N. Ogwumike (9)
| Taurasi (6)
| Crypto.com Arena3,340
|-
| rowspan=2 | Tuesday, July 5
| 7:00 p.m.
| Seattle
| @
| Indiana
| 
| 95–73
| Loyd (25)
| Magbegor (11)
| Bird (5)
| Indiana Farmers Coliseum2,585
|-
| 8:00 p.m.
| Connecticut
| @
| Dallas
| Facebook
| 71–82
| C. Williams (25)
| Gray (8)
| A. Thomas (6)
| College Park Center3,445
|-
| rowspan=3 | Wednesday, July 6
| 1:00 p.m.
| Chicago
| @ 
| Minnesota
| NBA TV
| 78–81
| Powers (22)
| Powers (11)
| Tied (6)
| Target Center11,103
|-
| 8:00 p.m.
| Washington
| @ 
| Atlanta
| CBSSN
| 85–66
| Delle Donne (26)
| Billings (9)
| Tied (4)
| Gateway Center Arena1,810
|-
| 10:00 p.m.
| New York
| @ 
| Las Vegas
| CBSSN
| 116–107
| Ionescu (31)
| Ionescu (13)
| Ionescu (10)
| Michelob Ultra Arena8,405
|-
| rowspan=3 | Thursday, July 7
| 7:00 p.m.
| Chicago
| @ 
| Indiana
| USA: League PassCanada: TSN5
| 93–84
| K. Mitchell (27)
| N. Smith (11)
| Vandersloot (6)
| Indiana Farmers Coliseum1,839
|-
| 10:00 p.m.
| New York
| @ 
| Phoenix
| Facebook
| 81–84
| Tied (23)
| Ionescu (10)
| Diggins-Smith (9)
| Footprint Center6,158
|- style="background:#FED8B1"
| 10:30 p.m.
| Seattle
| @ 
| Los Angeles
| Twitter
| 106–69
| Stewart (23)
| Magbegor (11)
| Loyd (7)
| Crypto.com Arena6,389
|- style="background:#FAFAD2"
| Sunday, July 10
| 1:00 p.m.
| colspan=3 | WNBA All-Star Game
| USA: ABCCanada: TSN3, SN1
| 134–112
| Plum (30)
| J. Jones (13)
| Vandersloot (8)
| Wintrust Arena9,572
|-
| rowspan=5 | Tuesday, July 12
| 3:00 p.m.
| Dallas
| @ 
| Seattle
| Facebook
| 74–83
| Stewart (19)
| McCowan (10)
| Bird (7)
| Climate Pledge Arena9,486
|-
| 7:00 p.m.
| Las Vegas
| @ 
| New York
| 
| 107–101
| Tied (27)
| Wilson (14)
| Young (7)
| Barclays Center5,201
|-
| rowspan=2 | 8:00 p.m.
| Atlanta
| @ 
| Chicago
| USA: League PassCanada: TSN1/4
| 75–90
| Ca. Parker (31)
| Ca. Parker (11)
| Meesseman (8)
| Wintrust Arena7,074
|-
| Phoenix
| @ 
| Minnesota
| 
| 107–118 (2OT)
| Cunningham (36)
| Fowles (14)
| Diggins-Smith (10)
| Target Center6,503
|-
| 10:30 p.m.
| Washington
| @ 
| Los Angeles
| 
| 94–81
| Delle Donne (26)
| C. Ogwumike (10)
| Cloud (9)
| Crypto.com Arena5,004
|-
| Wednesday, July 13
| 12:00 p.m.
| Connecticut
| @ 
| Indiana
| NBA TV
| 89–81
| K. Mitchell (21)
| J. Jones (14)
| A. Thomas (7)
| Indiana Farmers Coliseum3,212
|-
| rowspan=4 | Thursday, July 14
| 11:00 a.m.
| Las Vegas
| @ 
| New York
| USA: NBA TVCanada: SN1
| 108–74
| Wilson (25)
| N. Howard (9)
| Young (9)
| Barclays Center9,896
|-
| 8:00 p.m.
| Dallas
| @ 
| Minnesota
| Twitter
| 92–87
| Ogunbowale (32)
| Fowles (17)
| Harris (6)
| Target Center4,834
|-
| 10:00 p.m.
| Washington
| @ 
| Phoenix
| 
| 75–80
| Taurasi (29)
| Delle Donne (12)
| Diggins-Smith (9)
| Footprint Center5,994
|-
| 10:30 p.m.
| Chicago
| @ 
| Los Angeles
| Facebook
| 80–68
| Gardner (18)
| C. Ogwumike (13)
| Canada (8)
| Crypto.com Arena5,856
|-
| rowspan=2 | Friday, July 15
| 7:00 p.m.
| Minnesota
| @ 
| Indiana
| CBSSN
| 87–77
| McBride (28)
| Fowles (12)
| Tied (5)
| Indiana Farmers Coliseum1,530
|-
| 7:30 p.m.
| Connecticut
| @ 
| Atlanta
| USA: League PassCanada: TSN2
| 93–68
| J. Jones (21)
| Hillmon (11)
| Wheeler (6)
| Gateway Center Arena2,962
|-
| Saturday, July 16
| 8:00 p.m.
| Chicago
| @ 
| Dallas
| CBSSN
| 89–81
| Tied (23)
| Copper (14)
| Allemand (8)
| College Park Center5,126
|-
| rowspan=4 | Sunday, July 17
| 1:00 p.m.
| Las Vegas
| @ 
| Connecticut
| USA: ABCCanada: TSN2
| 91–83
| Plum (22)
| A. Thomas (14)
| C. Gray (9)
| Mohegan Sun Arena6,814
|-
| 3:00 p.m.
| Minnesota
| @ 
| Washington
| Facebook
| 57–70
| Delle Donne (21)
| Tied (12)
| Cloud (8)
| Entertainment and Sports Arena4,200
|-
| rowspan=2 | 6:00 p.m.
| Atlanta
| @ 
| Phoenix
| Amazon Prime
| 85–75
| Taurasi (23)
| Ch. Parker (12)
| Wheeler (7)
| Footprint Center7,963
|-
| Indiana
| @ 
| Seattle
| CBSSN
| 65–81
| Stewart (25)
| N. Smith (9)
| Bird (6)
| Climate Pledge Arena9,970
|-
| rowspan=3 | Tuesday, July 19
| 11:30 a.m.
| New York
| @ 
| Connecticut
| USA: NBA TVCanada: NBA TV Canada
| 63–82
| B. Jones (21)
| A. Thomas (13)
| C. Williams (6)
| Mohegan Sun Arena6,288
|-
| 10:00 p.m.
| Atlanta
| @ 
| Las Vegas
| USA: NBA TVCanada: NBA TV Canada
| 92–76
| Hayes (31)
| Tied (10)
| Plum (7)
| Michelob Ultra Arena5,952
|-
| 10:30 p.m.
| Indiana
| @ 
| Los Angeles
| CBSSN
| 79–86
| N. Ogwumike (35)
| C. Ogwumike (10)
| Canada (8)
| Crypto.com Arena5,478
|-
| Wednesday, July 20
| 12:00 p.m.
| Seattle
| @ 
| Chicago
| USA: NBA TVCanada: NBA TV Canada
| 74–78
| Stewart (24)
| Meesseman (10)
| Meesseman (6)
| Wintrust Arena8,893
|-
| rowspan=3 | Thursday, July 21
| 11:30 a.m.
| New York
| @ 
| Washington
| USA: NBA TVCanada: NBA TV Canada
| 69–78
| Delle Donne (25)
| N. Howard (10)
| Tied (5)
| Capital One Arena7,431
|-
| 3:30 p.m.
| Atlanta
| @ 
| Los Angeles
| USA: NBA TVCanada: NBA TV Canada
| 78–85
| N. Ogwumike (20)
| R. Howard (9)
| Canada (7)
| Crypto.com Arena10,021
|-
| 10:00 p.m.
| Indiana
| @ 
| Las Vegas
| USA: NBA TVCanada: NBA TV Canada
| 77–90
| Smith (23)
| Hamby (9)
| C. Gray (12)
| Michelob Ultra Arena5,737
|-
| rowspan=3 | Friday, July 22
| rowspan=2 | 8:00 p.m.
| Connecticut
| @ 
| Minnesota
| USA: NBA TVCanada: NBA TV Canada
| 94–84
| Bonner (20)
| A. Thomas (10)
| A. Thomas (12)
| Target Center8,321
|-
| Dallas
| @ 
| Chicago
| CBSSN
| 83–89
| Ogunbowale (28)
| Ca. Parker (10)
| Meesseman (9)
| Wintrust Arena7,014
|-
| 10:00 p.m.
| Seattle
| @ 
| Phoenix
| USA: NBA TVCanada: NBA TV Canada
| 78–94
| Diggins-Smith (35)
| Stewart (14)
| Taurasi (7)
| Footprint Center14,162
|-
| rowspan=2 | Saturday, July 23
| 7:00 p.m.
| Chicago
| @ 
| New York
| USA: NBA TVCanada: SN360
| 80–83
| Ca. Parker (21)
| Ca. Parker (11)
| Ionescu (9)
| Barclays Center6,926
|-
| 10:00 p.m.
| Los Angeles
| @ 
| Las Vegas
| USA: NBA TVCanada: NBA TV Canada
| 66–84
| Plum (29)
| Young (9)
| Young (6)
| Michelob Ultra Arena7,522
|-
| rowspan=3 | Sunday, July 24
| 3:00 p.m.
| Dallas
| @ 
| Indiana
| USA: NBA TVCanada: TSN4
| 96–86
| K. Mitchell (34)
| Thornton (8)
| K. Mitchell (6)
| Hinkle Fieldhouse1,159
|-
| 6:00 p.m.
| Atlanta
| @ 
| Seattle
| USA: NBA TVCanada: NBA TV Canada
| 72–82
| Charles (27)
| Charles (15)
| Bird (5)
| Climate Pledge Arena12,654
|-
| 7:00 p.m.
| Connecticut
| @ 
| Minnesota
| Amazon Prime
| 86–79
| Hiedeman (19)
| A. Thomas (10)
| Bonner (8)
| Target Center7,231
|- 
| rowspan=2 | Tuesday, July 26
|- style="background:#FED8B1"
| 8:30 p.m.
| Las Vegas
| @
| Chicago
| Amazon Prime
| 93–83
| Plum (24)
| Wilson (17)
| Tied (6)
| Wintrust Arena8,922
|-
| rowspan=4 | Thursday, July 28
| rowspan=2 | 7:00 p.m.
| Minnesota
| @ 
| Atlanta
| USA: TwitterCanada: NBA TV Canada
| 92–85
| Powers (25)
| Fowles (14)
| Jefferson (7)
| Gateway Center Arena2,396
|-
| Seattle
| @ 
| Connecticut
| USA: NBA TVCanada: SN1
| 83–88
| A. Thomas (19)
| Tied (10)
| A. Thomas (11)
| Mohegan Sun Arena9,137
|-
| 8:00 p.m.
| Washington
| @ 
| Dallas
| CBSSN
| 87–77
| McCowan (27)
| McCowan (11)
| Cloud (7)
| College Park Center4,382
|-
| 10:00 p.m.
| Los Angeles
| @ 
| Phoenix
| CBSSN
| 80–90
| Taurasi (30)
| N. Ogwumike (11)
| Diggins-Smith (6)
| Footprint Center8,124
|-
| rowspan=2 | Friday, July 29
| 7:00 p.m.
| Las Vegas
| @ 
| Indiana
| USA: NBA TVCanada: NBA TV Canada
| 93–72
| Tied (22)
| N. Smith (10)
| Tied (5)
| Hinkle Fieldhouse1,828
|-
| 8:00 p.m.
| New York
| @ 
| Chicago
| CBSSN
| 81–89
| Vandersloot (23)
| Copper (11)
| Vandersloot (9)
| Wintrust Arena6,924
|-
| rowspan=2 | Saturday, July 30
| 12:00 p.m.
| Seattle
| @ 
| Washington
| USA: ESPNCanada: TSN1/3
| 82–77
| Delle Donne (22)
| Tied (10)
| Cloud (11)
| Entertainment and Sports Arena4,200
|-
| 7:30 p.m.
| Dallas
| @ 
| Atlanta
| USA: NBA TVCanada: NBA TV Canada
| 81–68
| R. Howard (22)
| McCowan (14)
| Tied (8)
| Gateway Center Arena3,138
|-
| rowspan=5 | Sunday, July 31
| 1:00 p.m.
| Chicago
| @ 
| Connecticut
| USA: NBA TVCanada: TSN4
| 95–92 (OT)
| Copper (27)
| Stevens (10)
| Vandersloot (12)
| Mohegan Sun Arena6,254
|-
| 2:00 p.m.
| Phoenix
| @ 
| New York
| CBSSN
| 69–89
| N. Howard (23)
| Tied (12)
| Ionescu (16)
| Barclays Center6,433
|-
| rowspan=2 | 3:00 p.m.
| Las Vegas
| @ 
| Indiana
| USA: NBA TVCanada: NBA TV Canada
| 94–69
| Plum (26)
| N. Smith (13)
| C. Gray (7)
| Hinkle Fieldhouse1,822
|-
| Seattle
| @ 
| Washington
| Amazon Prime
| 75–78
| Tied (23)
| Austin (9)
| Cloud (10)
| Entertainment and Sports Arena4,200
|-
| 7:00 p.m.
| Minnesota
| @ 
| Los Angeles
| USA: NBA TVCanada: NBA TV Canada
| 84–77
| N. Ogwumike (23)
| Shepard (10)
| Canada (6)
| Crypto.com Arena6,857

|-
| rowspan=4 | Tuesday, August 2
| rowspan=3 | 7:00 p.m.
| Phoenix
| @ 
| Connecticut
| USA: NBA TVCanada: TSN1/5
| 63–87
| Hiedeman (16)
| A. Thomas (12)
| A. Thomas (10)
| Mohegan Sun Arena6,130
|-
| Los Angeles
| @ 
| New York
| CBSSN
| 73–102
| Ionescu (31)
| N. Howard (11)
| Xu (8)
| Barclays Center4,891
|-
| Las Vegas
| @ 
| Washington
| Facebook
| 73–83
| Wilson (22)
| Wilson (12)
| Cloud (9)
| Entertainment and Sports Arena4,200
|-
| 9:00 p.m.
| Dallas
| @ 
| Chicago
| CBSSN
| 84–78
| Mabrey (26)
| McCowan (12)
| Burton (9)
| Wintrust Arena5,602
|-
| rowspan=3 | Wednesday, August 3
| rowspan=2 | 7:00 p.m.
| Indiana
| @ 
| Atlanta
| USA: NBA TVCanada: NBA TV Canada
| 81–91
| N. Smith (21)
| Cannon (8)
| 3 tied (6)
| Gateway Center Arena2,071
|-
| Los Angeles
| @ 
| New York
| CBSSN
| 61–64
| Ionescu (20)
| Nelson-Ododa (10)
| Canada (8)
| Barclays Center5,315
|-
| 10:00 p.m.
| Minnesota
| @ 
| Seattle
| USA: NBA TVCanada: NBA TV Canada
| 77–89
| Stewart (33)
| Stewart (8)
| Tied (6)
| Climate Pledge Arena13,500
|-
| rowspan=2 | Thursday, August 4
| 7:00 p.m.
| Phoenix
| @ 
| Connecticut
| USA: ESPN2Canada: SN360
| 64–77
| Diggins-Smith (16)
| A. Thomas (13)
| B. Turner (7)
| Mohegan Sun Arena6,215
|-
| 8:00 p.m.
| Las Vegas
| @ 
| Dallas
| ESPN3
| 80–82
| C. Gray (28)
| McCowan (16)
| Plum (7)
| College Park Center3,492
|-
| rowspan=2 | Friday, August 5
| 7:30 p.m.
| Los Angeles
| @ 
| Atlanta
| CBSSN
| 86–88
| R. Howard (28)
| Hillmon (9)
| Canada (8)
| Gateway Center Arena3,138
|-
| 8:00 p.m.
| Washington
| @ 
| Chicago
| USA: NBA TVCanada: NBA TV Canada
| 83–93
| Hines-Allen (21)
| 3 tied (6)
| Vandersloot (7)
| Wintrust Arena8,042
|-
| rowspan=2 | Saturday, August 6
| 8:00 p.m.
| Indiana
| @ 
| Dallas
| USA: NBA TVCanada: NBA TV Canada
| 91–95 (OT)
| Thornton (21)
| McCowan (14)
| Tied (8)
| College Park Center4,184
|-
| 10:00 p.m.
| New York
| @ 
| Phoenix
| USA: NBA TVCanada: NBA TV Canada
| 62–76
| DeShields (25)
| 3 tied (8)
| Ionescu (5)
| Footprint Center11,724
|-
| rowspan=4 | Sunday, August 7
| 1:00 p.m.
| Connecticut
| @ 
| Chicago
| USA: ABCCanada: SN1
| 91–94
| Vandersloot (20)
| Ca. Parker (12)
| Bonner (6)
| Wintrust Arena8,224
|-
| rowspan=2 | 3:00 p.m.
| Los Angeles
| @ 
| Washington
| USA: ESPN3Canada: NBA TV Canada
| 79–76
| Sykes (21)
| Austin (10)
| Canada (12)
| Entertainment and Sports Arena4,200
|-
| Las Vegas
| @ 
| Seattle
| USA: ABCCanada: TSN4
| 89–81
| Stewart (35)
| Stewart (10)
| C. Gray (9)
| Climate Pledge Arena18,100
|-
| 7:00 p.m.
| Atlanta
| @ 
| Minnesota
| Amazon Prime
| 71–81
| McBride (20)
| Fowles (8)
| Tied (6)
| Target Center9,421
|-
| Monday, August 8
| 8:00 p.m.
| New York
| @ 
| Dallas
| USA: NBA TVCanada: NBA TV Canada
| 77–86
| Ionescu (32)
| McCowan (9)
| 3 tied (4)
| College Park Center3,036
|-
| rowspan= 3 | Tuesday, August 9
| 8:00 p.m.
| Seattle
| @ 
| Chicago
| USA: NBA TVCanada: TSN3
| 111–100
| Vandersloot (28)
| Stewart (9)
| Bird (8)
| Wintrust Arena9,314
|-
| 10:00 p.m.
| Atlanta
| @ 
| Las Vegas
| CBSSN
| 90–97
| Wilson (24)
| Wilson (14)
| Plum (8)
| Michelob Ultra Arena5,151
|-
| 10:30 p.m.
| Connecticut
| @ 
| Los Angeles
| USA: NBA TVCanada: NBA TV Canada
| 97–71
| Jo. Jones (21)
| Jo. Jones (10)
| A. Thomas (7)
| Crypto.com Arena5,789
|-
| rowspan=2 | Wednesday, August 10
| 8:00 p.m.
| New York
| @ 
| Dallas
| USA: League PassCanada: NBA TV Canada
| 91–73
| Mabrey (19)
| McCowan (13)
| Ionescu (7)
| College Park Center3,795
|-
| 10:00 p.m.
| Minnesota
| @ 
| Phoenix
| CBSSN
| 86–77
| Cunningham (24)
| Shepard (12)
| Jefferson (12)
| Footprint Center7,307
|-
| rowspan=2 | Thursday, August 11
| 10:00 p.m.
| Chicago
| @
| Las Vegas
| USA: NBA TVCanada: NBA TV Canada
| 78–89
| Copper (28)
| Ca. Parker (12)
| Tied (6)
| Michelob Ultra Arena6,055
|-
| 10:30 p.m.
| Connecticut
| @ 
| Los Angeles
| Twitter
| 93–69
| Tied (18)
| Tied (9)
| Bonner (7)
| Crypto.com Arena4,987
|-
| rowspan=4 | Friday, August 12
| 7:00 p.m.
| Washington
| @ 
| Indiana
| Facebook
| 82–70
| Delle Donne (24)
| Austin (11)
| Tied (6)
| Hinkle Fieldhouse1,700
|-
| 7:30 p.m.
| New York
| @ 
| Atlanta
| CBSSN
| 80–70
| Dangerfield (18)
| N. Howard (12)
| Tied (6)
| Gateway Center Arena3,138
|-
| 9:00 p.m.
| Seattle
| @ 
| Minnesota
| USA: ESPN2Canada: NBA TV Canada
| 96–69
| Charles (23)
| Fowles (12)
| G. Williams (7)
| Target Center12,134
|-
| 10:00 p.m.
| Dallas
| @ 
| Phoenix
| NBA TV
| 74–86
| DeShields (24)
| McCowan (9)
| Peddy (8)
| Footprint Center8,047
|-
| rowspan=6 | Sunday, August 14
| 1:00 p.m.
| Minnesota
| @ 
| Connecticut
| USA: ABCCanada: SN360
| 83–90
| L. Allen (26)
| Fowles (12)
| L. Allen (6)
| Mohegan Sun Arena7,489
|-
| 2:00 p.m.
| Atlanta
| @ 
| New York
| ESPN3
| 83–87
| R. Howard (24)
| Dolson (12)
| Tied (7)
| Barclays Center7,561
|-
| rowspan=2 | 3:00 p.m.
| Indiana
| @ 
| Washington
| ESPN3
| 83–95
| Delle Donne (22)
| Austin (6)
| T. Mitchell (7)
| Entertainment and Sports Arena4,200
|-
| Seattle
| @ 
| Las Vegas
| USA: ABCCanada: NBA TV Canada
| 100–109
| Loyd (38)
| Stewart (15)
| C. Gray (9)
| Michelob Ultra Arena10,015
|-
| 5:00 p.m.
| Chicago
| @ 
| Phoenix
| Amazon Prime Video
| 82–67
| Stevens (17)
| Gustafson (10)
| Allemand (6)
| Footprint Center12,383
|-
| 7:00 p.m.
| Dallas
| @ 
| Los Angeles
| USA: NBA TVCanada: NBA TV Canada
| 116–88
| Sykes (35)
| McCowan (8)
| Harris (11)
| Crypto.com Arena7,245

|-
! colspan=2 style="background:#094480; color:white" | 2022 WNBA Playoffs
|-

|-
| rowspan=2 | Wednesday, August 17
| 8:00 p.m.
| New York
| @ 
| Chicago
| USA: ESPN2Canada: SN360
| 98–91
| Tied (22)
| Ca. Parker (10)
| Vandersloot (10)
| Wintrust Arena7,524
|-
| 10:00 p.m.
| Phoenix
| @ 
| Las Vegas
| USA: ESPNCanada: NBA TV Canada
| 63–79
| Plum (22)
| B. Turner (16)
| Peddy (5)
| Michelob Ultra Arena8,725
|-
| rowspan=2 | Thursday, August 18
| 8:00 p.m.
| Dallas
| @ 
| Connecticut
| USA: ESPNU, NBA TVCanada: TSN2
| 68–93
| Jo. Jones (19)
| A. Thomas (10)
| A. Thomas (7)
| Mohegan Sun Arena4,797
|-
| 10:00 p.m.
| Washington
| @ 
| Seattle
| USA: ESPN2Canada: TSN2
| 83–86
| Delle Donne (26)
| Stewart (12)
| G. Williams (6)
| Climate Pledge Arena8,917
|-
| rowspan=2 | Saturday, August 20
| 12:00 p.m.
| New York
| @ 
| Chicago
| USA: ESPNCanada: NBA TV Canada
| 62–100
| Copper (20)
| Ca. Parker (12)
| Quigley (8)
| Wintrust Arena7,732
|-
| 9:00 p.m.
| Phoenix
| @ 
| Las Vegas
| USA: ESPN2Canada: NBA TV Canada
| 80–117
| C. Gray (27)
| B. Turner (7)
| C. Gray (8)
| Michelob Ultra Arena9,126
|-
| rowspan=2 | Sunday, August 21
| 12:00 p.m.
| Dallas
| @ 
| Connecticut
| USA: ABCCanada: SN1
| 89–79
| 3 tied (20)
| McCowan (11)
| A. Gray (8)
| Mohegan Sun Arena6,788
|-
| 4:00 p.m.
| Washington
| @ 
| Seattle
| USA: ESPNCanada: NBA TV Canada
| 84–97
| Tied (21)
| Stewart (10)
| Bird (10)
| Climate Pledge Arena12,940
|-
| Tuesday, August 23
| 9:00 p.m.
| Chicago
| @ 
| New York
| USA: ESPNCanada: TSN1/4
| 90–72
| 3 tied (15)
| Ca. Parker (13)
| Vandersloot (10)
| Barclays Center7,837
|-
| Wednesday, August 24
| 9:00 p.m.
| Connecticut
| @ 
| Dallas
| USA: ESPNCanada: TSN1/3/4
| 73–58
| Bonner (21)
| McCowan (12)
| Bonner (5)
| College Park Center5,016

|-
| rowspan=2 | Sunday, August 28
| 4:00 p.m.
| Seattle
| @ 
| Las Vegas
| USA: ESPNCanada: TSN3/4
| 76–73
| Loyd (26)
| T. Charles (18)
| Bird (12)
| Michelob Ultra Arena9,944
|-
| 8:00 p.m.
| Connecticut
| @ 
| Chicago
| USA: ESPN2Canada: TSN5
| 68–63
| Ca. Parker (19)
| Ca. Parker (18)
| Tied (7)
| Wintrust Arena8,955
|-
| rowspan=2 | Wednesday, August 31
| 8:00 p.m.
| Connecticut
| @ 
| Chicago
| USA: ESPN2Canada: NBA TV Canada
| 77–85
| J. Jones (23)
| A. Thomas (10)
| Vandersloot (8)
| Wintrust Arena8,311
|-
| 10:00 p.m.
| Seattle
| @ 
| Las Vegas
| USA: ESPN2Canada: SN360
| 73–78
| Wilson (33)
| Wilson (13)
| C. Gray (7)
| Michelob Ultra Arena9,755
|-
| rowspan=2 | Sunday, September 4
| 1:00 p.m.
| Chicago
| @ 
| Connecticut
| USA: ESPN2Canada: NBA TV Canada
| 76–72
| Bonner (18)
| A. Thomas (13)
| A. Thomas (7)
| Mohegan Sun Arena9,142
|-
| 3:00 p.m.
| Las Vegas
| @ 
| Seattle
| USA: ABCCanada: NBA TV Canada
| 110–98 (OT)
| Wilson (34)
| Stewart (15)
| C. Gray (12)
| Climate Pledge Arena15,431
|-
| rowspan=2 | Tuesday, September 6
| 8:00 p.m.
| Chicago
| @ 
| Connecticut
| USA: ESPN2Canada: TSN3
| 80–104
| Tied (19)
| Ca. Parker (9)
| Meesseman (6)
| Mohegan Sun Arena5,868
|-
| 10:00 p.m.
| Las Vegas
| @ 
| Seattle
| USA: ESPN2Canada: TSN3
| 97–92
| Stewart (42)
| Wilson (13)
| C. Gray (10)
| Climate Pledge Arena11,328
|-
| Thursday, September 8
| 8:00 p.m.
| Connecticut
| @ 
| Chicago
| USA: ESPN2Canada: NBA TV Canada
| 72–63
| Copper (22)
| Tied (10)
| A. Thomas (8)
| Wintrust Arena8,014

|-
| Sunday, September 11
| 3:00 p.m.
| Connecticut
| @ 
| Las Vegas
| USA: ABCCanada: TSN5
| 64–67
| Wilson (24)
| Tied (11)
| Tied (5)
| Michelob Ultra Arena10,135
|-
| Tuesday, September 13
| 9:00 p.m.
| Connecticut
| @ 
| Las Vegas
| USA: ESPNCanada: TSN1/4
| 71–85
| Wilson (26)
| J. Jones (11)
| C. Gray (8)
| Michelob Ultra Arena10,211
|-
| Thursday, September 15
| 9:00 p.m.
| Las Vegas
| @ 
| Connecticut
| USA: ESPNCanada: SN360
| 76–105
| Young (22)
| A. Thomas (15)
| A. Thomas (11)
| Mohegan Sun Arena8,745
|-
| Sunday, September 18
| 4:00 p.m.
| Las Vegas
| @ 
| Connecticut
| USA: ESPNCanada: SN1
| 78–71
| C. Gray (20)
| Wilson (14)
| A. Thomas (11)
| Mohegan Sun Arena9,652

Note: Games highlighted in  ██ represent Commissioner’s Cup games.All times Eastern

Statistical leaders

The following shows the leaders in each statistical category during the 2022 regular season through games played on August 14, 2022.

Playoffs and Finals

Season award winners

Player of the Week Award

Player of the Month Award

Rookie of the Month Award

Coach of the Month Award

Postseason awards

Coaches

Eastern Conference

Western Conference 

Notes:
 Year with team does not include 2022 season.
 Records are from time at current team and are through the end of the 2021 regular season.
 Playoff appearances are from time at current team only.
 WNBA Finals and Championships do not include time with other teams.
 Coaches shown are the coaches who began the 2022 season as head coach of each team.

Notes

References

 
2022 in American women's basketball
2021–22 in American basketball by league
2022–23 in American basketball by league
Women's National Basketball Association seasons